Towage may refer to: 
Towing, or a charge or fee associated with it
Tugboat, a boat that maneuvers larger boats